John Njue (born 1944) is a Kenyan Cardinal of the Catholic Church. He was the fourth Archbishop of Nairobi from 2007 to 2021. He previously served as Coadjutor Archbishop of Nyeri from 2002 to 2007 and Bishop of Embu from 1986 to 2002. He was elevated to the rank of cardinal in 2007.

Biography
Njue was born in Embu, Kenya, in 1944 to Joseph Nyanga Kibariki and Monica Ngina Nyaga. He was baptized in 1948, and entered the minor seminary in Nkubu in 1962. From 1967 to 1974, he furthered his studies in Rome at the Pontifical Urbaniana University (where he obtained a licentiate in philosophy) and Pontifical Lateran University (licentiate in pastoral theology).

On 6 January 1973, Njue was ordained to the priesthood by Pope Paul VI in St. Peter's Basilica. Returning to Kenya in October 1974, he did pastoral work in Kariakomu in the southern district of Meru. He also taught philosophy at the National Seminary of Bungoma, of which he later served as rector from 1978 to 1982. In 1982, he completed a course in spirituality in the United States. He then served as a parish priest in Chuka and rector of the Philosophical Seminary of Meru.

On 9 June 1986, Njue was appointed Bishop of Embu by Pope John Paul II. He received his episcopal consecration on the following 20 September from Jozef Cardinal Tomko, the co-consecrators being Bishops Silas Silvius Njiru and Raphael Ndingi Mwana'a Nzeki. He served as President of the Kenyan Episcopal Conference from 1997 to 2003, and was named Coadjutor Archbishop of Nyeri on 23 January 2002. Following the murder of Bishop Luigi Locati, he served as Apostolic Administrator of Isolo from 2005 to 2006.

Njue was appointed Archbishop of Nairobi on 6 October 2007, and was installed on the following 1 November. Shortly afterwards, he was created Cardinal-Priest of Preziosissimo Sangue di Nostro Signore Gesù Cristo by Pope Benedict XVI in the consistory of 24 November 2007. On 12 June 2008 he was named a member of the Congregation for the Evangelization of Peoples and the Congregation for the Clergy. On 29 December 2011 he was appointed a member of the Pontifical Council for Social Communications for a five-year renewable term. Cardinal Njue serves as Vice President of the International Catholic Migration Commission.

On 28 March 2013, he appealed for calm and peace during the upcoming Easter season as the Supreme Court of Kenya prepared to announce its verdict in the disputed initial round of the presidential election held on 4 March between Uhuru Kenyatta and Kenya's Prime Minister Raila Odinga. Kenyatta and Deputy President-elect William Ruto we're facing charges at the International Criminal Court (ICC) at The Hague that they instigated post-electoral violence in Kenya after the 2007 election.

He was one of the cardinal electors who participated in the 2013 papal conclave that elected Pope Francis.

On 30 November 2013, Cardinal Njue was named a Member of the Congregation for Catholic Education by Pope Francis.

In June 2013, after US President Barack Obama, whose father was Kenyan, said during an official visit in Senegal that African governments should follow the US example in taking action on gay rights, Njue replied "Let him forget, forget and forget". He said that the United States has "ruined their own societies" and that he does not "think God was making a mistake when he created Adam and Eve". A few weeks later, the Apostolic Nuncio to Kenya, Archbishop Charles Daniel Balvo, alongside Bishop Paul Kariuki of Embu, told a Catholic assembly that "The homosexuals should be defended against violation of their dignity and human rights, they are human beings like anyone of us".

In March 2014, Njue advised against participation in a free government program to vaccinate women of reproductive age against tetanus. He said that targeting women was "fishy". Other critics suggested the program was a disguised form of birth control. Government health officials said they were accustomed to such rumors from the government's critics. He led the Kenyan bishops in a campaign against the WHO-sponsored vaccination program, asserting that the vaccine was designed to lower fertility.

In June 2017, at a celebration of Family Day, Njue criticized men who put roadblocks in the way of marriages by making exorbitant demands for payment from the groom's family (bride price).

Pope Francis accepted his resignation as Archbishop of Nairobi on 4 January 2021.

Notes

References

External links
 
 

1944 births
Living people
People from Embu County
Kenyan cardinals
20th-century Roman Catholic bishops in Kenya
21st-century Roman Catholic archbishops in Kenya
Cardinals created by Pope Benedict XVI
Pontifical Lateran University alumni
Pontifical Urban University alumni
Members of the Pontifical Council for Social Communications
Members of the Congregation for the Clergy
Roman Catholic archbishops of Nairobi
Anglican bishops of Embu
Roman Catholic archbishops of Nyeri
Roman Catholic bishops of Embu
Roman Catholic bishops of Murang'a
Kenyan Roman Catholics
Kenyan Roman Catholic bishops
Kenyan expatriates in Italy